Capt. William Campbell Church (5 August 1883 – 28 June 1915) was a Scottish rugby union player.

Early life

Church was born in Partick, Glasgow, to William Reginald Monteith Church, a chartered accountant and stockbroker, and Christina Ainslie Church. He was educated at Glasgow Academy but left for Switzerland in 1902. He was educated at South African College.

Rugby Union career

Amateur career

He moved back to Scotland to attend university, where he played for Glasgow Academicals. He played on the wing for rugby union side.

Provincial career

He was capped by Glasgow District in 1906.

International career

He was also selected to play against New Zealand but he declined this.

Military career

He was killed in action in World War I while serving with the Cameronians during the Gallipoli campaign. He is on the Helles Memorial for the missing at Gallipoli.

References

External links
 "An entire team wiped out by the Great War".  The Scotsman, 6 November 2009

1883 births
1915 deaths
Rugby union players from Partick
Scottish rugby union players
Scotland international rugby union players
Glasgow Academicals rugby union players
British military personnel killed in World War I
Cameronians officers
Glasgow District (rugby union) players
Glasgow University RFC players
British Army personnel of World War I
Rugby union centres